This is a list of the largest cities west of the Mississippi River. The largest city on this list is Los Angeles, California. The portion of the United States that is west of the Mississippi River has more cities with over one million inhabitants than the east does. The west has about seven such cities while the east only has three. Cities in Alaska and Hawaii will be on this list. California and Texas have the most cities on this list. Cities with populations of over 300,000 with be on the list totaling 40.

Largest cities west of the Mississippi